Nauker may refer to:

Nauker (1943 film)
Nauker (1979 film)
Naukar, a 1975 Pakistani film directed by Naheed Akhtar, with music composed by M. Ashraf